Longwood Gardens is a botanical garden that consists of over 1,077 acres (436 hectares; 4.36 km2) of gardens, woodlands, and meadows in Kennett Square, Pennsylvania, United States in the Brandywine Creek Valley. It is one of the premier horticultural display gardens in the United States and is open to visitors year-round to enjoy native and exotic plants and horticulture (both indoor and outdoor), events and performances, seasonal and themed attractions, as well as educational lectures, courses, and workshops.

History

Longwood Gardens has a long varied history. For thousands of years, the native Lenni Lenape tribe fished its streams, hunted its forests, and planted its fields. Evidence of the tribe's existence is found in quartz spear points that have been discovered on and around the property and can be found on display in the Peirce-du Pont House on the Longwood Gardens property.

In 1700, a Quaker farmer named George Peirce purchased 402 acres of this English-claimed land from William Penn's commissioners. George's son Joshua cleared and farmed the land and in 1730 he built the brick farmhouse that, enlarged, still stands today.
In 1798, Joshua's twin grandsons Samuel and Joshua, who had inherited the farm, actively pursued an interest in natural history and began planting an arboretum that eventually covered 15 acres. The collection included specimens that they collected from the wild as well as plants acquired from some of the region's leading botanists.

By 1850, the arboretum boasted one of the finest collections of trees in the nation and had become a place for the locals to gather outdoors – a new concept that was sweeping America at the time. Community picnics and socials were held at Peirce's Park in the mid to late 19th century. The Pennsylvania guide noted in 1940 that "Longwood received its present name from 'Long Woods,' as the section was known before the Civil War, when Negro slaves fleeing from the South found shelter in this station on the Underground Railroad... which was supported by Quakers of Kennett Square, Hamorton, and Wilmington, Delaware."

As the 19th century rolled into the 20th, the family's heirs lost interest in the property and allowed the arboretum to deteriorate. The farm passed out of the family through several hands in quick succession, and a lumber mill operator was about to cut down the trees for timber in early 1906. This threat moved Pierre S. du Pont, American entrepreneur, businessman, philanthropist, and member of the prominent du Pont family to take action. On July 20, 1906, 36-year-old du Pont purchased the farm primarily to preserve the trees, in a transaction managed by Isabel Darlington, Chester County's first woman lawyer. He was not planning to create Longwood Gardens, but within a few years, his desire to make it a place where he could entertain his friends transformed a simple country farm into one of the country's leading horticultural display gardens.

Pierre du Pont opened the garden to the public in 1921 and in 1937 created the Longwood Foundation, which came under the control of trustees in 1946. When he died in 1954, he "had in place a well-funded yet adaptable mechanism for Longwood to continue." The garden was free, relying solely on its sizable endowment, until 1973, when it began charging admission.

In 2018, Longwood Gardens acquired the historic Longwood Cemetery from its volunteer-run management association. Chartered in 1855, Longwood Cemetery is located just outside of the main Gardens entrance, on Greenwood Road. It lies in front of the historic Longwood Progressive Friends Meeting House, founded by Quaker dissidents in 1854 and acquired by Pierre S. du Pont after it closed in 1940. Bayard Taylor, Eusebius Barnard, and Isaac Mendenhall are among the interments there.

Current use
Today the 1,077-acre Longwood Gardens consists of varied outdoor gardens, ranging from formal to naturalistic in their landscape design, and 20 indoor gardens within a 4.5 acre (1.8 hectares) group of heated greenhouses.  Longwood's Conservatory contains 4,600 different types of plants and trees, as well as fountains.  The gardens also has extensive educational programs including a tuition-free two-year school of professional horticulture, a graduate program, and extensive internships. It hosts hundreds of horticultural and performing arts events each year, from flower shows, gardening demonstrations, courses, and children's programs to concerts, organ and carillon recitals, musical theatre, fountain shows, and fireworks displays. It also hosts an extensive Christmas light display during the holiday season.

The gardens have attracted more than one million visitors a year since 2012. Plans for growth and expansion for the next four decades began in 2010 with the hiring of West 8, a Dutch landscape architecture and urban planning firm with headquarters in Rotterdam and an office in New York City. The founder of West 8, Adriaan Geuze, stated their mission is: "to celebrate Longwood, enjoy it, keep it, preserve it, while asking how it could function as a spectacular place for larger groups of people in the 21st century." The comprehensive Longwood plan is now complete and the first major project in the plan, the revitalization of the Main Fountain Garden, began in 2014.

Grounds and fountains

The development of Longwood as a public garden began in the 1800s with the Peirce family's arboretum. Joshua and Samuel Peirce collected many native and exotic trees, which they planted in straight rows on land east of their farmhouse. Pierce also added a historical marker for Hannah Freeman, purportedly the last surviving member of the Lenape people, who had been born in the area in 1731. This area became known as Peirce's Park toward the end of the 19th century. Visitors to Longwood Gardens today still enjoy Peirce's Park, which is now punctuated by the Sylvan Fountain, added by Pierre S. du Pont in 1925–27.

After Pierre S. du Pont purchased the property in 1906, he began developing the outdoor gardens further, adding the 600-foot long Flower Garden Walk in 1907. The Flower Garden Walk features a pool known as the Round Fountain at the intersection of the main paths. Its simple jet of water was Longwood's first fountain.

In 1914, Pierre S. du Pont added the Open Air Theatre after visits to the Villa Gori in Siena, Italy, provided inspiration.

From 1925 to 1927 du Pont designed and constructed the Italian Water Garden on a site northeast of Longwood's Large Lake, after gaining inspiration from a visit to the Villa Gamberaia, near Florence, Italy.

In 1928, du Pont began adding fountains to a garden he had begun developing in 1921. This space, directly south of the Conservatory, would become du Pont's most ambitious project—the five-acre Main Fountain Garden. The Main Fountain Garden "combines Italianate ornamentation and French grandeur with World's Fair showmanship. Like other great fountains, it is an engineering tour de force using the latest technology of the time." The Main Fountain Garden debuted to the public in 1931 and was the last major project in the gardens during du Pont's life.

In 1957, the Waterlily Display opened under the direction of Russell Seibert, who was Longwood's first director after Pierre du Pont's death in 1954.

In the 1970s, landscape architect Thomas Church was engaged to advise Longwood on long-range planning, garden improvement, and visitor circulation. He contributed to many spaces throughout the gardens, and designed the Theatre Garden (opened in 1975), the Wisteria Garden (opened in 1976), and the Peony Garden (opened in 1976).

By 1977, Thomas Church could no longer visit because of his declining health, and the English designer Sir Peter Shepheard became Longwood's consulting architect. In 1987 he re-worked the original Waterlily Display layout. The re-designed garden opened in 1988.

In 1995, landscape architect W. Gary Smith designed Peirce's Woods as an "art form" garden that brings together the most ornamental characteristics of the eastern deciduous forest. Thousands of native plants were added, including 10,000 rescued from the North Carolina mountains prior to impending highway construction.

In 2014, Longwood Gardens unveiled its new Meadow Garden, an American landscape spanning 86 acres that showcases native plantings. The Meadow Garden is actively propagated with herbaceous perennials and includes other interventions to manage invasive plants, control trees and shrubs, and promote wildlife. The Meadow Garden was designed by Jonathan Alderson of Jonathan Alderson Landscape Architects of Wayne, Pennsylvania). The historic Webb Farmhouse, which has stood on the property since the early 1700s, has been restored and serves as an interpretive center. John Milner Architects of Chadds Ford, Pennsylvania, led the restoration of the farmhouse.

In 2014, under the direction of Paul B. Redman, the gardens embarked on the largest project in its history, the revitalization of its historic Main Fountain Garden. Led by architects Beyer Blinder Belle and Landscape Architects West 8, the Main Fountain Garden re-opened on May 27, 2017.

Outdoor gardens and garden features include: Birdhouse Treehouse, Canopy Cathedral Treehouse, Caryopteris Allée, Children's Corner, Chimes Tower and Waterfall, Cow Lot, East Conservatory Plaza, Flower Garden Drive, Flower Garden Walk, Forest Walk, Hillside Garden, Idea Garden, Italian Water Garden, Large and Small Lake, Lookout Loft Treehouse, Main Fountain Garden, Meadow Garden, Oak and Conifer Knoll, Peirce's Park, Peirce's Woods, Peony Garden, Rose Arbor, Rose Garden, Student Exhibition Garden, Theatre Garden, Topiary Garden, Trial Garden, Waterlily Display, and Wisteria Gardens.

Conservatory

Longwood's first conservatory was built in 1914 when Pierre S. du Pont added an L-shaped extension to the original Peirce farmhouse, doubling its size. A conservatory connected the old and new wings.

Longwood's second and largest conservatory, opened in 1921, is home to 4,600 types of plants and trees. Since its original construction began in 1919, it has undergone expansions and renovations. On Palm Sunday in 1966, the Palm House opened. This space was designed by Victorine and Samuel Homsey. In 1989, the new Silver Garden opened. This garden was designed by Isabelle Greene, and is meant to evoke the feeling of a dry desert stream bed.

In 1988, Roberto Burle Marx was asked to redesign the former Desert House in the Conservatory. Brazilian Burle Marx was one of the most celebrated landscape designers of the 20th century, and he had already visited and lectured at Longwood several times. The new garden was named the Cascade Garden and it opened in June 1992.

In 1993, the 100-foot-long Mediterranean Garden opened in the Conservatory, designed by Ron Lutsko, Jr.

In January 2003, the East Conservatory was closed for renovation and redesign, with the main hall reopening to the public on October 29, 2005.

In 2007, a much larger Indoor Children's Garden was opened in the Conservatory, replacing a small children's garden that had been housed in the Conservatory since the 1980s.
In 2010, an indoor green wall, designed by British landscape architect Kim Wilkie was added to the Conservatory. This green wall contains 47,000 plants and was the largest green wall in North America when it opened. The Green Wall, which is the entrance way for a series of bathrooms, was voted America's Best Restroom in 2014.

Conservatory gardens include: Acacia Passage, Banana House, Bonsai Display, Camellia House, Cascade Garden, East Conservatory, Estate Fruit House, Exhibition Hall, Fern Passage, Garden Path, Green Wall, Indoor Children's Garden, Mediterranean Garden, Orangery, Orchid House, Palm House, Peirce-du Pont House, Rose House, Silver Garden, and Tropical Terrace.

Peirce-du Pont House

The Peirce-du Pont House dates from 1730 and is the oldest building at Longwood Gardens. It was the family homestead of the Peirce family until 1905 and then became the weekend residence of Pierre du Pont from 1906 until his death in 1954. It is now open to the public every day of the year and is included with general admission to the gardens.

This spacious country home resulted from five major periods of construction covering nearly 200 years. The original two-story brick farmhouse was built by Joshua Peirce in 1730 to replace a log cabin built in 1709. The brick pattern was Flemish bond brickwork with dark glazed headers and unglazed stretchers. The roof had a simple cornice and pent eaves protected the first floor windows and doors. In 1764, a two-story addition was made to the east end of the house and included a new dining room. The house was enlarged in 1824 adding a large addition to the north of the original structure. This building campaign doubled the size of the Peirce's house. In 1909, Pierre du Pont modernized the house with a two-story addition to the north. Plumbing, electricity, and heating were added throughout the house.

The largest addition was built by du Pont in 1914 when a mirror image of the original farmhouse was added to the north. At the same time, the two wings were connected by Longwood's first conservatory.

After Pierre du Pont's death in 1954, the 1914 rooms were converted into administrative offices. Many of du Pont's possessions were distributed to the du Pont family, although his garden books were retained and form the basis for Longwood's horticultural library. Du Pont's other books and his personal papers were transferred to what has become the Hagley Museum and Library near Wilmington, DE.

The Heritage Exhibit details Longwood's historical and horticultural legacy. It draws upon the extensive photographic and manuscript resources now stored at the Hagley Museum and Library to show the entire 300-year history of the property. Although the rooms housing the exhibit no longer appear residential, their architectural features have been preserved intact and are visible to visitors, as are photos in many rooms showing the decor during du Pont's occupancy.

Plant collections

Longwood's plant collection contains more than 10,000 taxa. Although the focus of the gardens is on horticultural displays, rather than developing extensive collections, the gardens have taken steps to prioritize certain collections and are designated as core collections, which receive special focus with regard to their development, management and display in the garden. Core collections are central to the mission of Longwood Gardens. Each core collection has a plan for its development, management and display, devised and periodically reviewed.
Core Collections are:

 Australia Collection:  The Australian Collection includes outstanding horticultural selections of plants native to Australia.
Bonsai and Penjing Collection:  The Bonsai and Penjing Collection includes outstanding examples of all styles and schools of Japanese bonsai and the Chinese art of penjing.
Boxwood Collection:  The Boxwood Collection includes plants of the genus Buxus procured from areas of their native distribution.
Camellia Collection:  The Camellia Collection includes historic horticultural selections of Camellia japonica of French or Belgian origin.
Chrysanthemum Collection:  The Chrysanthemum Collection includes historic Japanese cascade selections of the genus Chrysanthemum.
Du Pont Legacy Collection:  The Du Pont Legacy Collection includes plants acquired and grown at Longwood by Pierre and Alice du Pont between 1906 and 1954.
Fern Collection:  The Fern Collection includes representatives of all fern families, both tropical and hardy.
Holly Collection:  The Holly Collection includes native species and hybrids of the genus Ilex.
Lilac Collection:  The Lilac Collection includes horticultural selections of Syringa vulgaris, developed in the United States before the 1950s.
Magnolia Collection:  The Magnolia Collection includes species and horticultural selections of the genus Magnolia, native to eastern North America.
South African Collection:  The South African Collection includes bulbous, cormous, and tuberous species and horticultural selections of outstanding ornamental value native to the South Africa.
Oak Collection:  The Oak Collection includes species and horticultural selections of the genus Quercus, native to eastern North America.
Orchid Collection:  The Orchid Collection includes tropical species and horticultural selections of the family Orchidaceae cultivated before the 1950s.
Peirce's Tree Collection:  The Peirce's Tree Collection includes trees cultivated around Philadelphia at the turn of the 19th century.
Victoria Collection:  The Victoria Collection includes plants of the genus Victoria of documented wild origin or their progeny, and hybrids developed from them.
Waterlily Collection:  The Waterlily Collection includes horticultural selections of the genus Nymphaea developed in North America.

Longwood Gardens maintains a herbarium as a means to document its living plant collection. Herbarium specimens are indispensable in the process of verification of the identity of plants in the collection and in carrying out taxonomical research. As a whole, the herbarium preserves the history of Longwood's living collection for future generations. It also presents a unique value to Longwood Gardens' educational programs by providing instructional material. The herbarium collection serves not only the needs of Longwood Gardens but also of the scientific community at large. Of special significance are specimens of horticultural selections cultivated in the United States and specimens of plants introduced into cultivation through Longwood Gardens' plant exploration program.

Education programs
Longwood offers continuing education for both beginning and professional gardeners in the areas of ornamental horticulture, landscape design, visual arts, and floral design. It provides K-12 programs for students and educators that are tied to Next Generation Science Standards, and its high school offerings focus on such topics as environmental stewardship, biodiversity, and plant propagation.

College and University programs include internships for U.S. students in 16 areas of specialization: arboriculture, conservatory management, display design, education, greenhouse production, guest engagement and visitor programs, horticulture research, integrated pest management, library and information services, marketing and public relations, natural lands management, nursery management, outdoor display, performing arts, plant records management, and turf management. Internships for international students are offered in the areas of education, library science, marketing and public relations, and ornamental horticulture.

For those pursuing a career in horticulture, Longwood offers a two-year, tuition-free Professional Gardener program. Since 1967, Longwood has also partnered with the University of Delaware to offer the Longwood Graduate Program in Public Horticulture, for those seeking management and leadership positions with botanical gardens and other horticultural institutions.

Plant research
Compost Composition:  Determining the exact chemical properties of compost in order to identify soil blends that yield the greatest benefit for both the plant and the environment.
Cineraria Propagation:  Propagating a signature, blue Cineraria (Pericallis × hybrida).
Yellow Clivia:  Breeding a double-flowered yellow Clivia miniata.
Canna Virus:  Using micropropagation and plant tissue culture techniques to eliminate Canna virus, including bean yellow mosaic virus and other Potyvirus species.
Echium simplex:  Determining optimal sowing dates for the production of high-quality Echium simplex
Roldana petasitis:  Production of Roldana petasitis for Conservatory display.
Chrysanthemum Virus B:  Elimination of Chrysanthemum Virus B by harvesting meristem cells to produce virus-free Chrysanthemum stock.
Hardy Camellias:  Using the plant breeding techniques of embryo rescue and somatic embryogenesis to develop a Camellia variety that is cold hardy, easier to grow, and blooms year-round.
Cultivar Introduction:  Developing plant cultivars that are selected, named, or introduced by Longwood Gardens.
Plant Explorer: Phenology project to populate the Plant Explorer database and to help quantify climate change.
Herbarium:  Preservation of herbarium specimens for future reference, with special emphasis on species having historical significance, developed or discovered by Longwood, or extinct in the wild.
Plant Expeditions:  Plant exploration and plant collecting expeditions around the world.

Performing arts
Longwood's history as a performing arts venue coincides with the early history of the gardens. The first of Pierre S. du Pont's formal Gardens, the Flower Garden Walk, inspired him to host garden parties that often featured musical entertainment and fireworks.

Du Pont debuted his Open Air Theatre at such a garden party in 1914. By 1915 he had installed simple fountains in the stage floor, based on the Villa Gori theater he had visited in Italy. The Theatre was expanded in 1927 to include illuminated fountains in the stage floor and a 10-foot water curtain at its front. The 1,500-seat Open Air Theatre marked its 100th anniversary in 2014, having hosted more than 1,500 performances over the years, including theater troupes, Broadway-style musicals pageants, choruses, and the United States Marine Band. It continues to serve as a venue for summer performances.

In addition to using the Open Air Theatre, Longwood has experimented with a variety of performances in outdoor gardens—Indian sitar music set in the Italian Water Garden, Shakespearean theater staged on the Main Fountain Garden balcony, and modern dance choreographed for Peirce's Park.

Longwood's performance schedule expanded over time to become year-round, made possible by its indoor venues—the Ballroom and Exhibition Hall, both in the Conservatory.
The Ballroom re-opened in October 2005 after extensive renovations. It was originally constructed in 1929 to house Longwood's pipe organ and to serve as a venue for concerts, lectures, and dinners, a tradition that continues today. The Ballroom is architecturally unique for its parquet floor, fabric-paneled walls, and ceiling made of 1,104 panes of rose-colored etched glass.

The Exhibition Hall has hosted hundreds of performing artists, including the Meyer Davis dance band, Metropolitan Opera sopranos, John Philip Sousa, and South African vocal groups. The bougainvillea trained on the pillars and walls is the original planting from the 1920s. Once used by the du Ponts for dances and dinner parties, the sunken marble floor is typically flooded with a few inches of water to reflect seasonal displays. The floor is periodically drained to continue the tradition of hosting performances and events in this space.

Organ
The resident Longwood Organ is a 10,010 pipe instrument designed by Longwood organist-in-residence Firmin Swinnen, a Belgian musician who moved to the US in 1916 and became a prominent theater organist in New York City. The organ's pipes filled fourteen railway freight cars, and they needed a 72-horsepower (54 kW) blower motor to supply the wind pressure; the instrument was the largest pipe organs ever installed in a private residence. Pierre du Pont ordered this massive Aeolian organ in 1929 to replace the previous organ of 3,650 pipes, which he donated to the University of Delaware where it stayed until 1964. The four-manual organ plays into the Longwood ballroom and can be heard throughout the Conservatory when adjoining window panels are opened. Its pipes may be viewed from the rear through glass panels in Longwood's organ museum. The Longwood Organ has recently undergone a restoration that began in 2004 and was completed in January 2011.

Carillon

In 1929, Pierre du Pont constructed Longwood's 61-foot-tall stone Chimes Tower based on a similar structure he had seen in France. He purchased the largest set of tower chimes he could find from the J.C. Deagan Company of Chicago after first borrowing one chime to test its carrying power. Twenty-five tubular chimes were installed in the upper tower chamber and du Pont installed a switch in the Peirce-du Pont House so he could activate the chimes from his residence.  These were replaced by an electronic carillon in 1956, and finally by a 62-cast-bell Eijsbouts carillon from the Netherlands installed in 2001

Visitors also enjoy live concerts in the summer and fall.

Seasonal attractions

While there are many art and music events at Longwood Gardens throughout the year, there are five major periods of time where the entire gardens have an overarching theme.  Those five themes and their approximate dates are:

 Orchid Extravaganza - Starts mid-January
 Spring Blooms - Starts at the beginning of April
 Festival of Fountains - Starts at the beginning of June
 Autumn's Colors - Starts in early September and finishes with the Chrysanthemum festival
 A Longwood Christmas - Starts close to Thanksgiving
 Garden Railway - Starts in October

Gallery

See also

 Hagley Museum and Library
 List of botanical gardens and arboretums in Pennsylvania
 List of museums in Pennsylvania
 Nemours Estate
 Winterthur Museum, Garden and Library

References

External links

 Karp, Walter, "The Powder Maker's Garden", American Heritage, April 1990

Botanical gardens in Pennsylvania
Brandywine Museums & Gardens Alliance
Museums established in 1946
Du Pont family residences
Parks in Chester County, Pennsylvania
Tourist attractions in Chester County, Pennsylvania
1946 establishments in Pennsylvania
Greenhouses in Pennsylvania